is a quarter in the borough Hamburg-Nord of Hamburg, Germany. In 2020 the population was 46,272.

History
On January 25, 1332, Langenhorn was sold to Hamburg by the Count of Holstein. Since then, Langenhorn has been a part of Hamburg.

A subcamp to the Neuengamme concentration camp existed in Langenhorn from September 12, 1944 until April 4, 1945.

Geography
In 2006, according to the statistical office of Hamburg and Schleswig-Holstein, the quarter Langenhorn has a total area of 13.8 km². To the north and the west is the state Schleswig-Holstein. In the east is the quarter Hummelsbüttel of the Wandsbek borough and in the south is the quarter Fuhlsbüttel.

Demographics
In 2006, the population of the Langenhorn quarter was 40,425. In 1999, there were 20,546 households, and 43.8% of all households were made up of individuals.

Education
There are 6 elementary schools and 5 secondary schools in the Langenhorn quarter.

Infrastructure

Established in 1832, the Honorary Consulate of the Kingdom of Belgium is located in the street Langenhorner Markt 9.

Health systems
The Alskelpios Klinik Nord has a total of 1,331 beds and 143 day care places in 13 departments. It is divided into the branches Ochsenzoll and Heidberg, both formerly independent public hospitals. Both are general hospitals and teaching hospitals to the University of Hamburg and have the capacity to dispatch emergency medical services. The branch Ochsenzoll, Langenhorner Chaussee 560, is specialized in psychiatric problems and geriatric diseases. There are 178 beds in  forensic psychiatry for hospital treatment. The branch Heidberg, Tangstedter Landstr. 400, parts located in a former SS barracks, provides the ophthalmology, ear, nose and throat and the gynaecology and the maternity clinic departments.

There were 22 day-care centers for children, 57 physicians in private practice and 11 pharmacies.

Transportation
Langenhorn is served by the Hamburg U-Bahn rapid transit system with several stations. According to the Department of Motor Vehicles (Kraftfahrt-Bundesamt), 16,274 private cars were registered (403 cars/1000 people) in the quarter Langenhorn .

Notable persons
Helmut Schmidt, former Chancellor of Germany, lived in Langenhorn.

Notes

References

 Statistical office Hamburg and Schleswig-Holstein Statistisches Amt für Hamburg und Schleswig-Holstein, official website 
 Hospitals in Hamburg 2006, Government Agency for Social Affairs, Family Affairs, Health and Environment of Hamburg website

External links

Quarters of Hamburg
Neuengamme concentration camp
Hamburg-Nord